Täby IS is a Swedish cross-country skiing, track and field athletics and non-competitive floorball team from Täby outside Stockholm. The club has also had a football section which in 2012 merged with IFK Täby to form Täby FK.

Background
Täby IS's football section played its last season in Division 4 Stockholm Norra which is the sixth tier of Swedish football. They played their home matches at the Tibblevallen in Täby. Notable former Täby IS players include Kenneth Italiener, Magnus Eriksson, Andrés Thorleifsson, and Daniel Sundgren. They are now operating as Täby FK.

The club was affiliated to Stockholms Fotbollförbund.

Season to season

Footnotes

External links
 Täby IS Fotboll – Official website
 Täby IS FK on Facebook

Football clubs in Stockholm
1923 establishments in Sweden
Sports clubs established in 1923
Swedish floorball teams